TVersity Media Server is  a software application that streams multimedia content from a personal computer to UPnP, DLNA and mobile devices (Chromecast is also supported). It was the first media server to offer real-time transcoding. Some examples of supported devices are the Xbox 360, PlayStation 3, and Wii.

The first version of the software was released back on May 10, 2005 and it offered real-time transcoding of personal media and web media from the very first day. For example, the Xbox 360 does not support most codecs. TVersity Media Server transcodes the video on the PC into a compatible codec and then streams it to the device.

TVersity aims to:
 Deliver any media to any device
 Provide a Personal Entertainment Guide (PEG) by allowing users to create a personalized lineup of channels from URLs, RSS feeds, playlists and more.

While built from open source components, TVersity Media Server as a whole is not open source (except for the bundled codecs). TVersity Pro sells for $24.99 in the U.S., though there is also a free version available that does not stream from online video sites and does not transcode.

References

External links

Media players
Media servers